Zonguldak Province is a province along the western Black Sea coast region of Turkey. The province is 3.481 km in size and has a population of 619,703. Its adjacent provinces are Düzce to the southwest, Bolu to the south, Karabük to the southeast, and Bartın to the east. The capital is Zonguldak. Its Governor is Mustafa Tutulmaz.

Since the discovery of coal in the province, Zonguldak has become a major coal production center.

Districts 

Zonguldak province is divided into 8 districts (capital district in bold):
 Alaplı
 Çaycuma
 Devrek
 Gökçebey
 Ereğli (Heraclea Pontica)
 Kilimli
 Kozlu
 Zonguldak

Sites of interest 

Ilıksu, Kapuz, Göbü beaches, National Sovereignty Forest, Lake (Göl) Mountain, Plateau, Kocaman, Bostanözü, Çamlık, Baklabostan and Gürleyik forest recreation areas, Cumayanı, Kızılelma, Mencilis caves.

Museums 
The Ereğli Museum, located in the town of Ereğli, is the only museum in the city.

Ereğli 
Ereğli was founded during the 6th century B.C. by the Mariandynians, who were the successors of the Phrygians. Ereğli was an important commercial wharf, which takes its name from the famous mythic hero, Hercules (Heracles). The city preserved its importance during the Roman, Byzantine, Seljuk, and Ottoman Empire periods. Important historical ruins in the region include the Acheron Valley ruins, in which the Cehennem Ağzı caverns are located, along with Hellenic, Roman, Byzantine and Ottoman ruins, Ereğli Castle, Heracles Palace, Çeştepe Lighthouse tower, Byzantine water cisterns, Krispos mausoleum, Byzantine church and Halil Paşa Mansion.

Beaches 

Many natural and sandy beaches may be found along a fifty-mile (80 km) stretch of the coast. Beginning from the east, these beaches include: Sazköy, Filyos, Türkali, Göbü, Hisararkası, Uzunkum, Tersane, Kapuz, Karakum, Değirmenağzı, Ilıksu, Kireçlik, Armutçuk, Black Sea Ereğli, Mevreke, Alaplı and Kocaman.

Promenade 
The boroughs of the city are used as daily recreation areas for leisurely hikes by regional residents. Boroughs are artificial lakes intended to provide drinking water or serve other industrial purposes. These boroughs are: Ulutan Dam Lake at the center, Kızılcapınar Dam Lake, and Gülüç Dam Lake in Ereğli, Dereköy Pond at Çatalağzı borough and Çobanoğlu Pond (18 ha.) at Karapınar borough.

The most important waterfalls of the city are: Harmankaya at Center Kokaksu site, Değirmenağzı at Kozlu borough and Güneşli waterfalls at Ereğli, and their environs are also used for trekking.

Caves 
Cehennemağzı Cave, Gökgöl, Kızılelma, İnağzı and Cumayanı are the notable caverns.

National and Natural Parks 
 Zonguldak Nature Protection Area

Local celebrations 

 April 3 - Anniversary of Ground Breaking for Iron and Steel Works Karabük
 June 4–11 - International Black Sea Ereğli Ottoman Strawberry Culture Festival
 June 11–13 - Festivals: Black Sea Ereğli Culture and Strawberry Festival
 June 21 - Commemoration day for Uzun Mehmet Zonguldak
 June 21–26 - Zonguldak Black Diamond Black Sea International
 July 1 - Maritime Day Ereğli
 July 1 - Cabotage Celebrations
 July 1–31 - International Youths Interchange Program
 July 8–9 - Walking Stick Festival Devrek
 August 26 - Visiting of Atatürk - Commemoration Day
 September 3–9 - 16th Traditional Wrestling
 September 3–9 - Alaplı Hazelnut, Culture, Art and Sports Festival
 November 8 - Commemoration for Uzun Mehmet and Coal Celebrations Ereğli
 December 4–9 - World Miners' Day
 Çaycuma Yogurt Culture & Art Festival Çaycuma

Festivities 
 June 18 - Freedom from Occupation Days: Freedom Day - Ereğli
 June 18–24 - Music Feast
 June 21 - Freedom Day
 July 5–7 - Traditional Yenice Wrestling Competitions (Yağlı and Karakucak) Yenice
 July 16–22 - Devrek Walking Stick and Culture Festival
 July 23–29 - Circumcision Feast
 August 26 - Arrival of Atatürk at Zonguldak
 August 31 - September 1 - Traditional Wrestling Festivities Alaplı
 September 3–9 - Circumcision Feast

Coal mining

History

The discovery of coal in the Ereğli (Heraclea) region (known today as the Zonguldak basin) dates back to the reign of Sultan Mahmud II, and its extraction to Sultan Abdülmecid's reign.

The first specimen of Turkish coal was brought from Ereğli to Istanbul in 1822, but nothing was done for exploration and exploitation of this coal. However, in 1829, another specimen of coal was brought to Istanbul by Uzun (Long) Mehmet, a sailor and native of the village of Kestaneci, near Ereğli. This time attention was given to the discovery and the sailor received a reward of a life pension, but before he could benefit from this reward he was murdered.

The first miners requested and delivered from the Austrian Government are the Austrian Croats known to have been employed in the Ereğli Coal Mines. The correspondence between Istanbul and the embassy in Vienna show that coal production in the Ereğli Basin predates the March 1837 request by 18 months and that production started around September 1835.

An investigation of Hazine-i Hassa (Ottoman Imperial Treasury Department) records in the
Ottoman archives shows that regular mining activities in the Ereğli Basin started in February 1841. This is confirmed by a newspaper article published in the 14 February 1841 issue of Ceride-i Havadis.

Ereğli Coal Company, chartered by six partners (Ahmed Fethi Pasha, Rıza Pasha, Safveti Pasha, Tahir Bey Efendi, Izzet Pasha and Mustafa Efendi), excavated the coal in the Ereğli Coal Basin, initially under the auspices of Darphane-i Amire and later transferred to Hazine-i Hassa when the latter was established in 1849.

Timeline of the administration of the Ereğli coal mines after 1845

1848-1854 Administration by Hazine-i Hassa
1849-1854 English (and Galata goldsmiths) Coal Company’s Management
1854-1856 Temporary administration by the English during the Crimean war
1856-1861 Administration by Hazine-i Hassa
1856-1859 Operated by Trust Administration
1859-1860 Operated by Zafiropulos
1860-1861 Operated by the English Coal Company
1861-1865 Administration by Hazine-i Hassa
1865-1908 Administered by the Ministry of Navy
1865-1882 Operated by Shipbuilding Administration
1882-1940 Operated by local and foreign capital companies
1908-1909 Administered by Nafia Nezareti (Ministry of Public Works)
1909-1920 Administered by the Ministry of Forestry, Agriculture and Mineral Trade
1914-1922 Period of World War I and the National Liberation War
1920-1940 Administered by the Ministry of Economics
1926-1940 Operated by Türkiye İş Bankası (Ankara)
1937-1940 Operated by ETIBANK (Ankara) and EKI
1940-1957 Administered by ETIBANK and EKI (Ereğli Komurleri Isletmesi - Zonguldak)
1957-1984 Administered by TKI (Ankara)
1984–present Administered by TTK (Turkiye Taşkomuru Kurumu - Zonguldak)

In 1851, the Company’s production fields are mentioned in the accounting records as "coal mines administered by the Company under the irade-i seniyye in Ereğli, Amasra and various places". "Various places" mentioned in the records are not known for sure. Records of the period after the Sultan’s participation in the firm mention "coal mines administered by the Company in Bezekli, Amasra, Karaburun areas and various places". (The name Zonguldak did not yet exist in 1851.)

After 1865, one of these "various places" is named as Zone-Goul-Dagh or Zon-Goul-Dak, with mixed Turkish-French pronunciation.

References on internet document of http://www.archivesnationales.culture.gouv.fr/ web site:
  
Ports des mines d'Héraclée (19)
89 AQ 1703 Documentation et correspondence sur la construction du port de Zongouldak (20). 1893-1896
89 AQ 1704 Etudes et projets des ports de Zongouldak et de Koslou par A. Guérard. 1891-1897
89 AQ 1705 Projet du port de Zongouldak. 1897
89 AQ 1706 Projet du port de Zongouldak. 1897-1898
89 AQ 1707 Projet du port de Zongouldak. 1898-1899
89 AQ 1708 Arbitrage entre la Société des ports d'Héraclée et la Compagnie de Fives-Lille (21). 1898

Zone-Goul-Dagh was born as a port town of east Ereğli Coal Mines. Its name was probably given by miners/administrators who speak French. (Société d'Héraclée !?) (Probably, the first name of the town was "Sea Port of Zone-Goul-Dagh"... Because, Goul mountain is about 2-3 kilometers far from sea side...)

Coal mining today
Current coal mining/extraction zones of Zonguldak province/region
Armutçuk (Ereğli), Kozlu (Kozlu), Üzülmez (Zonguldak), Çaydamar (Zonguldak), Baştarla (Zonguldak), Kilimli (Kilimli), Karadon (Kilimli-Çatalağzı), Gelik (Çatalağzı), Amasra (Amasra, Bartın Province)
Coal washing/treatment plants Zonguldak and Çatalağzı Coal Treatment Plants.
Coal transport (delivery and import)
Ports: Zonguldak Sea Port (transport to Ereğli and Istanbul direction), Amasra Port, Ereğli Port
Other usable port for mine transport: Bartın Port (coal, cement etc.)
Railway: Zonguldak-Ankara Railway (transport to Karabük and Ankara direction)
Thermic power plants Çatalağzı Thermoelectric Power Plant units (use coal powder), in Işıkveren ward.
Iron-steel plantsEreğli (Erdemir) Iron and Steel Works, Karabük (Kardemir, Karabük province) Iron and Steel Works.
Average heat capacity of Zonguldak coals 7000 kcal/kg.

Mining disasters
Several mining disasters have occurred in the Zonguldak mines:
1992: A gas explosion killed 270 workers. This was Turkey’s worst mining disaster.
2008: In a mine collapse, one miner died.
2010: In the 2010 Zonguldak mine disaster, an explosion in the state-operated Karadon mine, at least 28 miners were killed.

See also 
 Erdemir
 Zonguldak basin

References

External links

  Zonguldak governor's official website
  Zonguldak municipality's official website
  Zonguldak weather forecast information